Mayo Clinic Health System — Franciscan Healthcare is one of the two hospitals in La Crosse, Wisconsin. Franciscan Healthcare is part of the Mayo Clinic Health System  This hospital has 142 beds and provides emergency services and an Intensive Care Unit.

References

External links
Mayo Clinic Health System - Franciscan Healthcare

Buildings and structures in La Crosse, Wisconsin
Hospitals in Wisconsin
Mayo Clinic